Chandrashekhar "Chan" Janardan Joshi (born July 22, 1953, at Wai, Maharashtra, India) is an Indian-American experimental plasma physicist. He is known for his pioneering work in plasma-based particle acceleration techniques for which he won the 2006 James Clerk Maxwell Prize for Plasma Physics. 

Joshi was elected a member of the National Academy of Engineering in 2014 for contributions to development of laser- and beam-driven plasma accelerators.

He is currently Distinguished Professor of Electrical Engineering, the director of the Center for High Frequency Electronics and the head of the Neptune Laboratory for Advanced Accelerator Research at UCLA.

Early life and education 
Joshi had his primary education at Dravid High school, Wai. While in 9th grade, he was selected by 'Pestalozzi Children's village Trust' in England and went to England for his further studies. He received his B.Sc. (1974) in nuclear engineering from the University of London and Ph.D. (1978) in applied physics from the University of Hull, which are both in the United Kingdom. Following a two-year stint as a research associate at the National Research Council of Canada, where he worked on laser-plasma interactions, he joined UCLA first as a researcher and became a faculty member since 1988.

Scientific contributions 
At UCLA, Joshi has built a strong research group that has done pioneering work in the areas of laser-plasma instabilities, plasma-based light sources, laser fusion and basic plasma experiments. Joshi has made many fundamental contributions to the understanding of extremely nonlinear optical effects in plasmas. Most notable including his first experimental demonstration of four-wave mixing, stimulated Raman forward instability, resonant self-focusing, frequency upshifting by ionization fronts and nonlinear coupling between electron-plasma waves. His group is best known, however, for developing the field of plasma-based particle accelerators over the past three decades.

Honors and awards 
Joshi is a Fellow of the APS, IEEE and UK Institute of Physics. He is also the recipient of the 1996 John Dawson Award for Excellence in Plasma Physics Research (jointly awarded with Christopher E. Clayton) as well as the 1997 . He was the APS Centennial Speaker (1999) and a Distinguished Lecturer in Plasma Physics (2001). He was elected to the National Academy of Engineering in 2014.

Citations 
 John Dawson Award for Excellence in Plasma Physics Research (1996): "For their pioneering experiments in Plasma Based Accelerator Concepts; particularly for their unambiguous experimental demonstration that electrons can be accelerated to relativistic energies by the beating of two laser beams in a plasma with their frequency difference equal to the plasma frequency."
 USPAS Prize for Achievement in Accelerator Physics and Technology (1997): "For pioneering experiments on high gradient, laser-driven, plasma beat-wave acceleration."
 James Clerk Maxwell Prize for Plasma Physics (2006): "For his insight and leadership in applying plasma concepts to high energy electron and positron acceleration, and for his creative exploration of related aspects of plasma physics."

References

Publications
 
 

 
 
 

1953 births
Living people
Alumni of the University of London
Fellows of the American Physical Society
Plasma physicists
American physicists
Indian physicists
American people of Indian descent
Fellow Members of the IEEE
Fellows of the Institute of Physics
Alumni of the University of Hull
American plasma physicists